Invercargill is the southernmost and westernmost city in New Zealand, and one of the southernmost cities in the world. It is the commercial centre of the Southland region. It sits amid rich farmland that is bordered by large areas of conservation land and marine reserves, including Fiordland National Park covering the south-west corner of the South Island and the Catlins coastal region.

Many streets in the city, especially in the centre and main shopping district, are named after rivers in Scotland. These include the main streets Dee and Tay, as well as those named after the Tweed, Forth, Tyne, Esk, Don, Ness, Yarrow, Spey, Eye and Ythan rivers, amongst others.

The 2018 census showed the population was 54,204, up 2.7% on the 2006 census number and up 4.8% on the 2013 census number.

History

Southland was a scene of early extended contact between Europeans and Māori, notably whalers and missionaries – Wohlers at Ruapuke. In 1853, Walter Mantell purchased Murihiku from local Māori iwi, claiming the land for European settlement. Otago, of which Southland was itself part, was the subject of planned settlement by the Free Church of Scotland, an offshoot of the Church of Scotland. Settlement broadened with the discovery of gold in Central Otago in the 1860s. Traces of Scottish speech persist in Southland voices, with R often pronounced with a rolling burr. This is more noticeable among country people.

In 1856, a petition was put forward to Thomas Gore Browne, the Governor of New Zealand, for a port at Bluff. Due to the Otago gold rush, the region's population grew during the 1860s with the settlement of Bluff. Browne agreed to the petition and gave the name Invercargill to the settlement north of the port. Inver comes from the Scottish Gaelic word inbhir meaning a river's mouth and Cargill is in honour of Captain William Cargill, who was at the time the Superintendent of Otago, of which Southland was then a part. The settlement's chief surveyor was John Turnbull Thomson, a British civil engineer.

Under the influence of James Menzies, Southland Province (a small part of the present Region, centred on Invercargill) seceded from Otago in 1861 following the escalation of political tensions. However, rising debt forced Southland to rejoin Otago in 1870 and the provincial system, and with it the province of Otago, was abolished entirely in 1876. This debt was caused by a population decline stemming from poor returns from pastoral farming. In 1874, Invercargill's population was less than 2,500 which reflected the drift north to large centres. In the 1880s, the development of an export industry based on butter and cheese encouraged the growth of dairy farming in Southland.

On 6 August 1884 a group of women gathered together in the Don Street Primitive Methodist Church to form a local branch of the Woman's Christian Temperance Union. Eliza Ann Brown, wife of Charles W. Brown (who that same year co-founded the local Independent Order of Rechabites), led the group to establish eight main objectives which included gathering signatures for a petition for women's suffrage. This was the first all-women's organisation established in New Zealand. After affiliating with the new national organisation, the Women's Christian Temperance Union of New Zealand, under the guidance of world missionary Mary C. Leavitt, Roberta Annie Hinton, wife of the new Baptist minister, led the new club as it worked to strengthen the temperance movement in the area and support the needs of women and children across the nation. By 1897 a founding member of this first branch of the WCTU Invercargill, Mrs. Elizabeth Stephen Baird, led the establishment of the Victoria Home for Friendless Girls.

In December 1905, Invercargill voted in local prohibition of alcohol sales. This lasted for 40 years until voted out by returning servicemen in the Second World War. Drinking continued meanwhile, thanks to hotels and liquor merchants in outlying districts, huge volumes of beer, often in kegs, brought to private homes, or sold by the glass by keggers at hiding spots round the City. When prohibition ended, a committee of citizens persuaded the Government to give the monopoly on liquor sales in Invercargill to the specially formed Invercargill Licensing Trust. Based on a scheme in Carlisle, England, it returns profits to city amenities. Even today, alcohol is not sold in supermarkets.

Publicity has been brought to the city by the election of Tim Shadbolt, a colourful and outspoken former student activist and former mayor of Waitemata City, as mayor. He once appeared on a cheese advertisement stating "I don't mind where, as long as I'm Mayor". His supporters like the colour he brings to the city. His opponents refer to his controversial mayoral career in the Auckland suburbs and to his attitude to veterans during his opposition to the Vietnam War. Publicity and students have also come to the city by the Southern Institute of Technology's "Zero Fees" scheme, which allows New Zealand citizens and permanent residents to study while only paying for material costs of their study, and not tuition fees.

Geography

Invercargill is the southernmost city in the Commonwealth of Nations. Invercargill is situated on the fertile and alluvial Southland Plains, which is amongst some of New Zealand's most fertile farmland. Southern Invercargill lies on the shore of the New River Estuary, while the northern parts lie on the banks of the Waihopai River. A tributary of the Waihopai is the Otepuni Stream or Creek, which flows from east to west through the city and under the railway yards. 10 kilometres west of the city centre lies Oreti Beach, a long expanse of sand stretching from the Sandy Point area to nearby Riverton.

Invercargill has a temperate oceanic climate. Rainfall averages  annually, and measurable snowfall is occasionally seen during the winter months of June to September. It is tied with neighbouring Dunedin as the cloudiest city in New Zealand with only 1,680 hours of sunshine per annum. Despite its cloudiness, and a relatively high frequency of rainy days, Invercargill receives less rain than either Auckland or Wellington. Invercargill is also New Zealand's second windiest city, after Wellington.

Suburbs
Inner Invercargill suburbs:

 Invercargill C.B.D.1
 Appleby
 Ascot
 Avenal
 Clifton
 Georgetown
 Gladstone
 Glengarry
 Grasmere
 Hargest
 Hawthorndale
 Heidelberg
 Kew
 Kingswell
 Newfield
 Prestonville
 Richmond
 Rockdale
 Rosedale
 Strathern
 Waihopai
 Waikiwi1
 Waverley
 West Invercargill
 Windsor

Outer Invercargill localities:

 Awarua
 Awarua Plains
 Bluff1
 Greenhills
 Greenpoint
 Kennington
 Lorneville1
 Mill Road
 Motu Rimu
 Myross Bush
 Ocean Beach
 Omaui
 Oreti Beach
 Otatara1
 Sandy Point
 Seaward Bush
 Taramoa
 Tisbury
 Tiwai Point
 Underwood
 West Plains
 Waimatua
 Woodend

1 - major settlement

Climate
Owing to its relatively high latitude (46° 24′), the city enjoys nearly 16 hours of daylight at the summer solstice in late December, with astronomical night lasting as little as 2.5 hours. Conversely, the city receives only around 8.5 hours of daylight at the winter solstice in late June.

Invercargill is the "City of Water and Light". The "light" refers to the long summer twilights and the aurora australis (southern lights). The "water" reference, humorists suggest, comes from notorious horizontal, driving rain in high wind at the corner of the two main streets, Dee and Tay. A recent sign also states "Invercargill, where dreams can come true" with an image from the 2005 film The World's Fastest Indian.

In September 2010, Invercargill's heaviest snowfall in living memory heralded a run of unseasonably cold weather. A few buildings were damaged, notably Stadium Southland, the roof of which collapsed under the weight of the snow; and a decorating store. Many other stores were shut, and Invercargill Airport was closed for a day.

Demographics
This comprises  people in the Invercargill urban area,  people in the Bluff urban area, and  people in the surrounding settlements and rural area.

Invercargill City had a population of 54,204 at the 2018 New Zealand census, an increase of 2,508 people (4.9%) since the 2013 census, and an increase of 3,879 people (7.7%) since the 2006 census. There were 21,585 households. There were 26,517 males and 27,687 females, giving a sex ratio of 0.96 males per female. The median age was 39.4 years (compared with 37.4 years nationally), with 10,560 people (19.5%) aged under 15 years, 10,053 (18.5%) aged 15 to 29, 24,249 (44.7%) aged 30 to 64, and 9,345 (17.2%) aged 65 or older.

Ethnicities were 85.0% European/Pākehā, 17.4% Māori, 3.8% Pacific peoples, 5.7% Asian, and 2.0% other ethnicities. People may identify with more than one ethnicity.

The percentage of people born overseas was 12.2, compared with 27.1% nationally.

Although some people objected to giving their religion, 51.0% had no religion, 37.5% were Christian, 0.8% were Hindu, 0.4% were Muslim, 0.5% were Buddhist and 2.2% had other religions.

Of those at least 15 years old, 6,633 (15.2%) people had a bachelor or higher degree, and 11,145 (25.5%) people had no formal qualifications. The median income was $29,900, compared with $31,800 nationally. 5,991 people (13.7%) earned over $70,000 compared to 17.2% nationally. The employment status of those at least 15 was that 21,885 (50.1%) people were employed full-time, 6,561 (15.0%) were part-time, and 1,650 (3.8%) were unemployed.

Government

Local

The Invercargill City Council governs the territorial authority of Invercargill. It is made up of an elected mayor and 12 additional councillors. They are elected under the First Past the Post system in triennial elections, with the last election being held in 2022. The current mayor is Nobby Clark.

As of 2022, the current council members are:

Coat of arms

National
The electorate of Invercargill in the New Zealand Parliament is held by Penny Simmonds, a member of parliament from the opposition National Party. Under the Māori electorates system, Invercargill is part of the large Te Tai Tonga electorate, which covers the entire South Island and the surrounding islands, and is currently held by the Labour Party MP Rino Tirikatene.

Economy
Invercargill is home to the Southern Institute of Technology, which has introduced a zero-fees scheme. The scheme was partly responsible for rejuvenating the city when it was in a steady state of population decline. However the major factor in Invercargill's regrowth is the dairy industrial boom of the 2000s (decade) due to an increased demand for New Zealand milk, cheese and butter. New dairy factories have opened around the Southland Region, as well as more efficient meat processing works and research and development facilities.

Invercargill is on the Southern Scenic Route (tourist road), allowing day trips to Queenstown, Stewart Island / Rakiura, Dunedin, Te Anau and Fiordland.

Liquor licensing trusts
The Invercargill Licensing Trust is one of several trusts in the city of Invercargill. The Invercargill Licensing Trust and the ILT Foundation are major funders of community projects in Invercargill. The ILT Foundation provides donations and grants totalling around $10 million a year to over 500 organisations. The trust has also been influential in the development of city facilities such as the ILT Stadium Southland and Invercargill Velodrome. The trust are also big-time backers of local sporting franchises the Southern Steel, Southland Sharks and Southland Stags.

The Community Trust of Southland was established after Westpac bought out the Trust Bank Southland in the late 1990s. It was sold for approximately $150 million, with those funds now being set aside for the people of the Southland regions, including Queenstown, Arrowtown and Tapanui.
It is widely recognised as one of New Zealand's leading community trusts, with the benefit of a large capital base for a relatively small population. Consequently, the Trust provides significant funding to a wide range of projects and programmes. Each year, it distributes between $7 and $10 million in the region, not including the large sums given to sports franchises and building projects and since its inception has distributed close to $140 million in grants.

Brewing
Invercargill was home to Invercargill Brewery, the southernmost manufacturer of beer in New Zealand. Established in 1999, it was an internationally award-winning production brewery which also contract brews for other iconic New Zealand breweries, including Yeastie Boys. The company went into receivership in 2018.

Tourism
Invercargill has a growing tourism sector. Attractions such as E Hayes, Bill Richardson Transport World, Dig This and Classic Motorcycle Mecca attract people to the area.

Culture

Murihiku Marae is located in Invercargill. It is a marae (meeting ground) of the Waihōpai Rūnanga branch of Ngāi Tahu, and includes Te Rakitauneke wharenui (meeting house).

During the late 1880s a small periodical called Literary Southland contained stories as well as memoirs of the pioneering days of the region. The publication was distributed from a store in the northern end of Invercargill. While largely forgotten today, it was considered relatively popular at the time, if at times controversial.

Sport

The Southern Sting (Netball- Now Southern Steel) won seven National titles from 1999–2004, 2007, while the local rugby team the Southland Stags held the Ranfurly Shield from 22 October 2009 to 9 October 2010 and have made the NPC Semi-finals for the past three years.
Southland also has one of the highest percentages of sports participants in the country, with codes such as rugby union, netball, basketball, cricket, and hockey being popular. Many professional sportsmen too, have come out of Southland as well. Invercargill also has some high quality sporting facilities, including an indoor velodrome, an Olympic sized swimming centre, a 20,000 capacity rugby stadium and also international playing arenas for both hockey and cricket.
The city's 4500 capacity indoor stadium was severely damaged in 2010, its roof collapsing following a heavy snowfall. Southland also has four professional sporting sides that are based in Invercargill:
 Southland Stags (Rugby)
 Spirit FC (Association Football)
 Southern Steel (Netball)
 Southland Sharks (Basketball)

Invercargill is home to the only indoor cycling velodrome in the South Island. The indoor 250 metres wooden velodrome is home to Track Cycling in Southland. The Invercargill Licensing Trust supports the velodrome which is situated at Stadium Southland, a large indoor sports complex located at Surrey Park.

For horse racing aficionados there is a racecourse in the aptly named Racecourse Road, on the east side of the city.

Music
The "Invercargill March," an internationally famous tune, was written by Alex Lithgow, who attended Invercargill Grammar School (now Middle School). In his book Invercargill – 150 Years, Lloyd Esler's opening sentence reads, "Invercargill was done a fine favour by Alex Lithgow who named his famous march after his boyhood home. The Invercargill March is possibly the best advertisement the town has ever had as the work is a brass-band favourite and the word 'Invercargill' is whispered amongst audiences worldwide. There is only one Invercargill in the world – this one".

When Invercargill hosted the national brass band contest in 1909, Alex's brother Tom asked for a test piece for the contest and Alex offered this piece to the city. On the music he wrote,

Education

Colleges
 The University of Otago College of Education has its southern most campus in Invercargill.
 Invercargill is home to the Southern Institute of Technology, a polytechnic which provides undergraduate and postgraduate qualifications.
 The Southern Wings Aviation College which operates out of Invercargill airport provides aviation licence training and the New Zealand Diploma in Aviation.

High schools

All high schools in Invercargill are Year 7–13, following a Ministry of Education review in 2004 that made most of Invercargill's primary schools Year 1–6, while also closing the Year 7–8 schools Rosedale Intermediate, Collingwood Intermediate and Tweedsmuir Junior High.
 James Hargest College is in northern Invercargill with about 1,800 pupils.
 Aurora College was established in 2005, after Mount Anglem College was closed in 2004.
 Southland Girls' High School In 2005 became the first state Year 7–13 single-sex female school in New Zealand.
 Southland Boys' High School In 2005 became the first state Year 7–13 single-sex male school in New Zealand.
 Verdon College is a co-educational Catholic school with about 700 pupils.
 Te Wharekura o Arowhenua A Māori school on Tweed street. Teaches years from 1–15.

Primary schools
Most primary schools are Year 1–6.

 New River Primary School, co-ed school for Years 1–6 in South Invercargill area. Formerly Kew, South, Clarendon and Clifton Schools.
 St Joseph's, a small co-ed school for Years 1–6, a Catholic school near St Mary's Basilica.
 St Theresa's, North Invercargill, a co-ed Catholic primary school.
 St Patrick's, Georgetown, a co-ed Catholic primary school.
 Ascot Community School, the only public co-ed school in Hawthorndale area.
 Fernworth Primary – co-ed school in Heidelberg area. Formerly St George and Elston Lea.
 Windsor North School, co-ed school in Rosedale area. Previously Invercargill North School.
 Waverley Park School, co-ed school in Waverley Park area.
 Waihopai School, co-ed school in Waihopai area.
 Salford School, co-ed school in Rosedale area.
 St John's Girls' School, small school. Invercargill's only private school. Christian character.
 Sacred Heart Primary School, North Road, Waikiwi, co-ed Special Character Catholic family school serving the northern suburbs of Waikiwi, Grasmere and Makarewa.
 Donovan Primary School, co-ed school Grasmere area. Formerly Grasmere, Waikiwi, West Plains. Current Principal is Peter Hopwood.
 Otatara Primary School, co-ed school in Otatara area.
 Myross Bush Primary School, co-ed school in Myross Bush area.
 Newfield Park School, co-ed school in Newfield
 Southland Adventist Christian School. A small co-ed school in the Waikiwi area. Formerly Seventh Day Adventist School. Christian Character.
 Middle School, co-ed school located in the middle of Invercargill
 Westmount School. A private (Brethren) school located in the Clarendon area.

Transport

Infrastructure and services
The main hospital in Invercargill is Southland Hospital, located in Kew. It is a public hospital operated by the Southern District Health Board.

The electricity distribution network in the majority of the Invercargill urban area is owned by Electricity Invercargill. The network in the suburbs of Waikiwi, Grasmere, Kew and Kingswell, as well as the surrounding rural area, is owned by The Power Company. Both networks are operated and maintained by Powernet. Electricity is supplied from Transpower's national grid at two substations: Invercargill (Racecourse Road) and North Makarewa.

Notable residents

 Bruce Aitken – drummer
 Peter Arnett – NBC war correspondent
 Peter Beck – Rocket Lab, founder and CEO
 Eliza Ann Brown - first president of the first WCTU organisation in New Zealand (1884)
 Oliver Bulleid – Railway locomotive designer and Chief Mechanical Engineer of the Southern Railway, born in Invercargill in 1882
 John Burke – Mayor of Porirua
 Johnnie Checketts – Silver Star, Wingco and Spitfire Ace
 Nathan Cohen – Olympic and two-time world champion rower
 Bill Crawford-Crompton – Silver Star, Air Vice Marshal and WW2 Commander and Ace
 Geoffrey Cox – Rhodes Scholar, Chief Intelligence Officer to General Freyberg in WWII, founded Britain's pioneering News at Ten on ITN.
 Marton Csokas – actor
 Dave Cull - former TV host and mayor of Dunedin
 Dan Davin – author, editor
 Corey Flynn – Hooker for All Blacks
 Ernest Godward – inventor of the spiral hairpin and the petrol economiser
 Dene Halatau – Wests Tigers Utility in the NRL
 Joseph Hatch – businessman, oil factor
 Brigadier James Hargest; CBE, DSO & 2 bars, MC, ED, MP – New Zealand chief military officer for Southland and politician
 Rowena Jackson – Royal Ballet prima ballerina
 Jason Kerrison – Opshop singer/songwriter
 Chris Knox – musician, cartoonist, filmmaker
 Brendon Leitch – racing driver
 Alex Lithgow – composer, musician, conductor
 Bill Manhire – inaugural NZ poet laureate
 Khan Manuel – Guitarist/Composer
 Herbert James "Burt" Munro – inventor, motorcycle enthusiast, racer and under-1000 cc land speed record holder
 Mils Muliaina – All Black
 Harry Norris – music director of the D'Oyly Carte Opera Company
 Anton Oliver – All Black
 Warren Parry – darts player
 Herbert Pither – aviation legend of Southland
 Suzanne Prentice – musician
 Boyce Richardson – journalist, author, filmmaker
 Lesley Rumball – former Silver Ferns Captain
 Tom Scully – cyclist, 2014 Commonwealth Gold Medallist
 Glen Thomson – cyclist, 1998 Commonwealth Gold Medallist, 1994 Commonwealth Bronze Medallist
 Victor Spencer – last soldier to be executed in World War I, pardoned in 2005
 David Strang – inventor of instant coffee in 1890
 Garfield Todd – Prime Minister of Southern Rhodesia
 Jeremy Waldron – legal and political philosopher
 Joseph Ward – Prime Minister of New Zealand
 Jeff Wilson – All Black and Black Cap ("Double All Black")
 Bob Yule – WWII fighter pilot

Sister cities

Current sister cities
  Kumagaya (since 1993)
  Suqian (since 2013)

Former sister city
  Hobart

See also
 Invercargill Golf Club
 Invercargill Rowing Club
 Invercargill Rugby Club (Blues)

Notes

References
 
 
 
 A Complete Guide To Heraldry by A.C. Fox-Davies 1909.

External links

 Invercargill City Council official website
 Invercargill i-SITE visitor information

 
Populated places in Southland, New Zealand
Southern Scenic Route
Former provincial capitals of New Zealand